Patryk Dominik Sztyber (born 4 August 1979, in Opoczno), stage name Seth, is a Polish heavy metal musician. He is best known for being the guitarist for Behemoth. He is also the guitarist for Polish death metal band Nomad.

Discography
Behemoth
Demigod (2004)
Slaves Shall Serve (2005)
Demonica (2006)
The Apostasy (2007)
At the Arena ov Aion – Live Apostasy (2008)
Ezkaton (2008)
Evangelion (2009)
Evangelia Heretika (2010)
Abyssus Abyssum Invocat (2011)
The Satanist (2014)
I Loved You at Your Darkest (2018)
Opvs Contra Natvram (2022)

Nomad
Disorder (1996)
The Tail of Substance (1997)
Devilish Whirl (1999)
Demonic Verses (Blessed Are Those Who Kill Jesus) (2004)
The Independence of Observation Choice (2007)
Transmigration of Consciousness (2011)
Transmorgrification (Partus) (2020)

Equipment
ESP Custom EX 7 String guitar with Winged Chaostar and Pentagram Fret Inlays
ESP LTD 400-BD
ESP EX Diamond Plate
ESP LTD Viper-407
Gibson Explorer
 2x Laboga Mr. Hector Amplifiers
 2x Laboga 312B Mr.Hector Cabinets
 Mark L rack system
 Mark L Midi Control System FC-12
 Mark L Loop & Switch LS-145
 Mark L DC/AC Power Box
 Mark L Mini Line Mixer
 Line 6 XT Pro
 Korg DTR 1 Tuner
 Neutrik & Switchcraft
 Boos Pitch
 Mogami Cable
 Furman Power
D'Addario Strings
Nologo Behemoth custom picks

References

External links

 Seth's profile at Behemoth's official website

1979 births
20th-century Polish male singers
21st-century Polish male singers
21st-century Polish singers
Black metal musicians
Behemoth (band) members
Death metal musicians
English-language singers from Poland
Polish heavy metal guitarists
Polish heavy metal singers
Polish male guitarists
Living people
People from Opoczno
Rhythm guitarists